Dave Wommack (born May 9, 1956) is a former American football coach.  He is the former defensive coordinator at the University of Mississippi.  Wommack was formerly the defensive coordinator for Arkansas State University and at the Georgia Institute of Technology. On January 8, 2010, Wommack was let go from his position as Georgia Tech by head coach Paul Johnson. A native of Kimberling City, Missouri, Wommack played college football at Missouri Southern State University.  Wommack lettered three years, as a center.  He is married, with two children. Wommack retired after the 2016 season.

References

1956 births
Living people
American football centers
Arkansas Razorbacks football coaches
Arkansas State Red Wolves football coaches
Bemidji State Beavers football coaches
Georgia Tech Yellow Jackets football coaches
Missouri State Bears football coaches
Missouri Southern Lions football players
Missouri Tigers football coaches
Ole Miss Rebels football coaches
South Carolina Gamecocks football coaches
Southern Miss Golden Eagles football coaches
UNLV Rebels football coaches
People from Kimberling City, Missouri